Talbot Hall is a historic house at the western end of Talbot Hall Road in Norfolk, Virginia.  It is a two-story masonry structure, built out of brick finished with stucco, and covered by a gable roof.  It was built c. 1799-1802 by Samuel Butt Talbot as a summer retreat, and the property features views similar to those it would have had in the 19th century, including two 19th-century magnolia trees that grace the waterfront on the Lafayette River.

The house was listed on the National Register of Historic Places in 2016.

See also
National Register of Historic Places listings in Norfolk, Virginia

References

Houses on the National Register of Historic Places in Virginia
Federal architecture in Virginia
Houses completed in 1802
Houses in Norfolk, Virginia
National Register of Historic Places in Norfolk, Virginia